Chiñi Lakha (Aymara chiñi bat, lakha mouth, "bat's mouth", Hispanicized spellings Chinilaca, Chiñilaca) is a mountain in the Andes of southern Peru, about  high. It is located in the Moquegua Region, Mariscal Nieto Province, Carumas District. Chiñi Lakha lies southwest of Jach'a Sirka and southeast of Tixani.

Chiñi Lakha is also the name of an intermittent stream which originates north of the mountain. It flows to the west.

References

Mountains of Moquegua Region
Mountains of Peru